Alex Okosi (full name: Ogbuefi Akunne Alex Uche Okosi) is a Nigerian-born, US-educated business executive.  Okosi is the managing director of EMEA Emerging Markets at YouTube.

Early life 
Okosi was educated in Enugu until the age of 12, before finishing his education in the USA. While visiting his brothers in the US, Okosi made the decision to stay in the US to complete his education, and he subsequently studied at schools in New York, Missouri, Nebraska and Florida before attending Phillips Exeter Academy in Exeter, New Hampshire.

Okosi continued his studies at Saint Michael's, Vermont - a liberal arts college in New England where he enrolled in a double major in business administration and economics. He graduated Magna cum laude in 1998.

Okosi was awarded a full scholarship to play Division II basketball for Saint Michael's. He represented his college at Basketball, captaining the Purple Knights’ second team to victory in 1998.

Career 
Prior to joining YouTube, Okosi spent 22 years at ViacomCBS (now Paramount Global). He was the executive vice president and managing director of ViacomCBS Africa, and led the BET International brand and ViacomCBS's global events business. He is credited with launching MTV's first TV channel in Africa, MTV Base, and building Viacom's entertainment business on the African continent In 2009, he launched the MTV Africa Music Awards.

Timeline 
1998 - Okosi joined MTV Networks in New York as part of the Trade and Integrated Marketing team. He developed multi-platform marketing opportunities for advertisers and integrated them into marquee MTV franchises such as the MTV Video Music Awards, Spring Break, the MTV Movie Awards, and Wanna Be a VJ.

2000 - Okosi transferred to the MTV Networks Affiliate Sales & Marketing division in Los Angeles, where he was responsible for securing distribution for MTV Networks brands such as MTV, Nickelodeon, VH1, CMT, MTV2, and Spike TV.

2003 - Okosi moved to MTV International in London as a Manager in the MTV International Strategy & Business Development team

2005 - Okosi named VP & General Manager, MTV Base

2007 - Okosi named SVP & MD, MTV Networks Africa

2013 - Okosi's title changed to SVP & MD, Viacom International Media Networks (VIMN) Africa

2017 - Okosi was promoted to MD & EVP, Viacom International Media Networks Africa and EVP of BET International

2020 - Okosi joined YouTube as MD, YouTube EMEA Emerging Markets

MTV Base (Africa) 
Having joined MTV International, Okosi authored the business plan to launch MTV's first African TV channel.  Known initially as MTV base (with a lowercase 'b'), the channel was launched in 2005, becoming MTV's first African TV channel and MTV's 100th channel worldwide.  The channel was designed to provide a high quality platform that promoted African contemporary music and creativity, while catering to the tastes and attitudes of African youth.  The channel featured African contemporary urban musicians and music videos, alongside some longform music and entertainment shows.  The launch of the new service was marked with two live music celebrations - MTV Base 100th Live!  - held days apart in April 2005 in Abuja, Nigeria and Johannesburg, South Africa.

YouTube 
Okosi joined YouTube in April 2020 as the managing director of YouTube EMEA Emerging Markets.

Okosi played a key role in landing YouTube's $100M Black Voice Fund in EMEA and partnered with Idris Elba to launch the annual Africa Day Benefit Concert.

He is also an executive member of the Google and YouTube committees tasked with driving and delivering the companies’ racial equity commitments across the EMEA region.

Awards and Achievements 
2011 - Okosi was named as New Champion for an Enduring Culture at the ThisDay Awards, receiving his award from Arnold Schwarzenegger.

2013 - New African Magazine: “Africa’s 50 Trailblazers Under 50”

2013 - New African Magazine: “Top 100 most Influential Africans”

2013 - Okosi named Young Global Leader at the World Economic Foundation (WEF)

2014 - Ai Investment & Business Leader Awards: “Up & Coming Future Leader of the Year”

2018 - All Africa Business Leader Award Finalist

2019 - Okosi appointed Honorary Fellow of the Nigerian Institute of Marketing of Nigeria

2021 - Okosi named to the UK "Powerlist 2022" which recognises the UK’s 100 most influential people of African heritage.

2022 - Okosi was honoured in the UK "Powerlist" for the second year running

References 

Nigerian media executives
Living people
Nigerian expatriates in the United States
Nigerian expatriates in the United Kingdom
People from Enugu
UCLA Anderson School of Management alumni
Phillips Exeter Academy alumni
Year of birth missing (living people)
MTV Africa Music Awards
World Economic Forum Young Global Leaders
YouTube
Nigerian expatriates in South Africa
Nigerian technology businesspeople
Alphabet Inc. employees
People from Onitsha by occupation
Google